Egnasia ephyrodalis is a moth of the family Noctuidae first described by Francis Walker in 1858.

Distribution
It is found in India, Sri Lanka, Bangladesh, Thailand and Myanmar.

Description
Its wingspan is 34 mm. Head, thorax, abdomen and wings are yellowish brown. Forewing with an acute apex. Thorax and abdomen has smooth scales. A hyaline (glass-like) spot is found in the cell and an irregular hyaline spot found on the discocellulars composed of conjoined spots. Hindwings with crenulate outer margin. A hyaline lunulate mark is found on a rufous patch at end of cell. Cilia whitish at apex and towards anal angle. Underside of the wings are suffused with grey.

References

Moths of Asia
Moths described in 1858